Bainbridge State College was a public college in Bainbridge, Georgia. It was part of the University System of Georgia which was merged it into Abraham Baldwin Agricultural College in 2017. A separate campus in Blakely, Georgia was Bainbridge College Early County (which was built in 1999 as Albany Technical College. The Early County Satellite Center was bought by Bainbridge College in 2006). There was also a campus in Donalsonville, Georgia that opened in 2016.

Students commuted from the nearby towns of Attapulgus, Blakely, Brinson, Cairo, Camilla, Climax, Colquitt, Donalsonville, Iron City, Pelham, Thomasville, and Whigham. With the inclusion of Gadsden County to the college's service area, students from neighboring Florida communities also attended as in-state students.

History
The college was established in 1970 with support of local citizens, including former Georgia governor Marvin Griffin, and its doors opened in 1973, during the governorship of Jimmy Carter. Dr. Edward Mobley was the first president.  He served from the beginning of the college until 1999, when Dr. Clifford Brock took over, for a tenure that saw enrollment grow by 256 percent. Minority enrollment grew from 24 percent to more than 50 percent as students flocked to the formerly tiny school. Dr. Thomas Wilkerson became president in 2005.

The 1973 charter faculty consisted of Dr. Robert DuBay, Dean; Dr. R. Everett Langford, Chemistry and Geology; and Dr. Ray Chambers, History.

On February 13, 2013, the Board of Regents for the University System of Georgia officially announced that Bainbridge College had been converted into a 4-year state college, and its name was officially changed to Bainbridge State College.

In 2017, the college ceased to exist as a separate entity. The consolidation of Bainbridge State College with Abraham Baldwin Agricultural College (ABAC) became official December 2017 upon the approval of the Board of Regents of the University System of Georgia.

As of July 1, 2018, ABAC offered academic programs in Bainbridge. Southern Regional Technical College (SRTC) assumed responsibility for the technical programs available in Bainbridge.

References

External links 
Entry for Bainbridge College on the New Georgia Encyclopedia webpage
 Official website (archived)

Universities and colleges accredited by the Southern Association of Colleges and Schools
Educational institutions established in 1970
Education in Early County, Georgia
Schools in Decatur County, Georgia
Buildings and structures in Early County, Georgia
1970 establishments in Georgia (U.S. state)
2018 disestablishments in Georgia (U.S. state)
Defunct public universities and colleges in Georgia (U.S. state)
University System of Georgia